Walter Garstang FLS FZS (9 February 1868 – 23 February 1949), a Fellow of Lincoln College, Oxford and Professor of Zoology at the University of Leeds, was one of the first to study the functional biology of marine invertebrate larvae. His best known works on marine larvae were his poems published as Larval Forms and Other Zoological Verses, especially The Ballad of the Veliger. They describe the form and function of several marine larvae as well as illustrating some controversies in evolutionary biology of the time.

Garstang was known for his vehement opposition to  Ernst Haeckel's Biogenetic Law, now discredited. He is also noted for his hypothesis on chordate evolution, known as Garstang's theory, which suggests an alternative route for chordate evolution from echinoderms.

Early life

Walter Garstang was born on 9 February 1868 as the eldest son of Dr Walter Garstang of Blackburn and his wife Matilda Mary Wardley, and older brother of the archaeologist John Garstang.

In 1895 he married Lucy Ackroyd; they had one son, Walter Lucian Garstang,. and five daughters.

Academic career
In 1884 at the age of 16, he was awarded a scholarship to Jesus College, Oxford and was initially going to study medicine. Under the guidance of Henry Nottidge Moseley, he joined the school of Zoology and graduated in 1888 at the age of 20. Before graduation, Garstang was offered a position as secretary and assistant to Gilbert C Bourne, the new resident director of the Marine Biological Association of the United Kingdom in Plymouth. There he met Ray Lankester. In 1891 he left Plymouth and was a Berkley Research Fellow under Milnes Marshall at Owens College, Manchester. A year later, Garstang returned to Plymouth as Assistant Naturalist, only to be elected a Fellow of Lincoln College, Oxford, in 1893. In 1894, while Ray Lankester held the Linacre Chair, he became a lecturer at Lincoln College and in 1895 he started the series of Easter classes in which he took students on week-long field courses to Plymouth.

Between 1902 and 1907 Garstang was employed by the MBA as the principal investigator working on North Sea fisheries. He helped to establish a fisheries laboratory in Lowestoft that was later to become the Centre for Environment, Fisheries and Aquaculture Science (Cefas), part of the Ministry of Agriculture, Fisheries and Food (United Kingdom). Garstang instigated a series of detailed fisheries surveys throughout the southern North Sea aboard the RV Huxley, under the auspices of the newly formed International Council for the Exploration of the Sea (ICES).

Garstang was Professor of Zoology at the University of Leeds from 1907 to 1933.  The Garstang Building at the university is named in his honour. In 1912 in cooperation with Professor Alfred Denny of the University of Sheffield he established the Robin Hood's Bay Marine Laboratory. The minutes of Sheffield's Faculty of Pure Science on 12 March 1912 record the following resolution that was carried unanimously: That the Faculty approves of the proposal to extend the work of the Department of Zoology by co-operating with the University of Leeds in establishing a small marine Zoological Laboratory at Robin Hood's Bay.

Garstang's hypothesis

Garstang made the radical suggestion that the chordates evolved from the larvae of another group, whether the larvae of hemichordates or of echinoderms, by progenesis (which Garstang called "neoteny"). Echinoderm larvae, like chordates, are bilaterally symmetric. Especially notable are their similarities to larvae of hemichordates, which are a step closer to chordates as they share two of the five most commonly noted chordate characteristics, namely a hollow neural tube and pharyngeal slits.

Garstang's idea has been expanded and is supported by many lines of evidence. Perhaps most interesting and compelling is the fact that some amphibians can stay in larval form and still reach sexual maturity—this shows that echinoderm larvae could, theoretically, have become sexually mature and simply stopped morphing into adults, instead evolving into chordate ancestors. Species that show this refusal to leave the larval stage include mud puppies and other salamanders, which either partially or completely show neoteny (also called pedomorphism): retention of juvenile traits or phenotypes after sexual maturity.

Garstang's hypothesis (this term is also used for his proposals on gastropod torsion, as described in The Ballad of the Veliger) was revolutionary for both its time and idea: it suggests that not only may single species evolve, but that single life stages of species may evolve into separate organisms. The hypothesis, which Garstang proposed in the early 20th century, seemed far-fetched at the time of its conception and did not receive support until after Garstang's death.

Poetry

Larval Forms and Other Zoological Verses
First published in 1951, two years after his death, Larval Forms and Other Zoological Verses is a compilation of 26 poems by Garstang on the form, function and development of various larval invertebrates. Although they were published posthumously, Garstang had had a desire to publish them for many years and never did because he always thought he would add to them. Except for the introduction written by Sir Alister Hardy, everything in the final publication, including the title and order of the poems, was his own work.

Many of his poems were written to express his views on the scientific theories of the time. Most notable may be The Axolotl and the Ammocoete which speculates an evolutionary relationship between the Axolotl and the Ammocoete. Alister Hardy wrote on this in the Introduction to Larval Forms:

 Only a few months before he died Garstang had drafted a communication to Nature to put forward his latest suggestion that Amphioxus might be regarded as a paedomorphic ammocoete-like larva of a Cyclostome; it was never sent, because the day on which he was to have posted it he found that the whole of his idea had recently and quite independently been published by the great Stensio.

Most of these poems were written before 1922 and reflect the knowledge and theories of that time. In some of the poems, some of the animals, or species of animals, have speaking parts. The poems included in his final work are:

The Ballad of the Veliger 

Walter Garstang's most famous zoological verse, The Ballad of the Veliger, was first published in 1928 and privately printed. Copies were handed out at that year's BA meeting, where he gave the Presidential Address to the Zoology section.

The Ballad of the Veliger orHow the gastropod got its twist

The Veliger's a lively tar, the liveliest afloat,A whirling wheel on either side propels his little boat;But when the danger signal warns his bustling submarine,He stops the engine, shuts the port, and drops below unseen.

He's witnessed several changes in pelagic motor-craft;The first he sailed was just a tub, with a tiny cabin aft.An Archi-mollusk fashioned it, according to his kind,He'd always stowed his gills and things in a mantle-sac behind.

Young Archi-mollusks went to sea with nothing but a velum—A sort of autocycling hoop, instead of pram—to wheel 'em;And, spinning round, they one by one acquired parental features,A shell above, a foot below—the queerest little creatures.

But when by chance they brushed against their neighbours in the briny,Coelenterates with stinging threads and Arthropods so spiny,By one weak spot betrayed, alas, they fell an easy prey—Their soft preoral lobes in front could not be tucked away!

Their feet, you see, amidships, next the cuddy-hole abaft,Drew in at once, and left their heads exposed to every shaft.So Archi-mollusks dwindled, and the race was sinking fast,When by the merest accident salvation came at last.

A fleet of fry turned out one day, eventful in the sequel:Whose left and right retractors on the two sides were unequal:Their starboard halliards fixed astern alone supplied the head,While those set aport were spread abeam and served the back instead.

Predaceous foes, still drifting by in numbers unabated,Were baffled now by tactics which their dining plans frustrated.Their prey upon alarm collapsed, but promptly turned about,With the tender morsel safe within and the horny foot without!

This manoeuvre (fide Lamark) speeded up with repetition,Until the parts affected gained a rhythmical condition,And torsion, needing now no more a stimulating stab,Will take its predetermined course in a watchglass in the lab.

In this way, then, the Veliger, triumphantly askew,Acquired his cabin for'ard, holding all his sailing crew—A Trochophore in armour cased, with a foot to work the hatch,And double screws to drive ahead with smartness and despatch.

But when the first new Veligers came home again to shore,And settled down as Gastropods with mantle-sac afore,The Archi-mollusk sought a cleft his shame and grief to hide,Crunched horribly his horny teeth, gave up the ghost, and died.

Archives
The National Marine Biological Library at the Marine Biological Association in Plymouth holds some of Garstang's archival material (diaries and photographs) and documents relating to the Easter Classes. Leeds University Special Collections also holds some archival material.

References

External links
 
 Larval Forms and Other Zoological Verses at ISBNdb.com
 Abalone: Larval defenses
 Archival material at Leeds University Library

1868 births
1949 deaths
British evolutionary biologists
English marine biologists
English zoologists
Alumni of Jesus College, Oxford
Fellows of Lincoln College, Oxford
Academics of the University of Leeds
Fellows of the Linnean Society of London
Fellows of the Zoological Society of London